Mogons or Moguns was a Celtic god worshiped in Roman Britain and Gaul. The main evidence is from  altars dedicated to the god by Roman soldiers.

Etymology
According to J.T. Koch at the University of Wales, the various alternations of the name Moguns derive from the Romano-Celtic dialectal reflexes of Proto-Celtic *mogont-s (a derivative of the Proto-Indo-European root *megH2- "to be great, mighty"), an Indo-European *-nt- -stem cognate with Sanskrit mahānt and Avestan mazant ‘great’.

Centres of worship
Altar-stones raised to Mogons have been recovered in the United Kingdom, such as the stones found at the following locations. The number is the catalog number of the artifact and the name in parentheses is the word as it appears on the stone, not necessarily (and probably not) in the nominative case. Most are datives, to be translated as "to the god":

Voreda (Old Penrith): 921 (Mogti), 922 (Mounti)
Castra Exploratorum (Netherby, Cumbria): 971 (Mogont Vitire)
Habitancum (Risingham): 1225 (Mogonito, dative of *Mogonitus, adjective formed from *Mogons), 1226 (Mouno, *Moguno, dative of *Mogunus)
Bremenium (High Rochester): 1269 (Mountibus, *Moguntibus, dative plural of *Moguns)
Vindolanda (Chesterholm): 1722d (Mogunti et Genio Loci).

Modern Mainz takes its name from Castrum Moguntiacum, a Roman base placed there. It is hypothesized that Moguns gave his name to it.  The inscription at Habitancum identifies the troops stationed at that location as being from the Vangiones, the Gaesati and Rhaetia; i.e., from Germania Superior. Mainz was in the territory of the Aresaces, a Celtic tribe probably part of the Treveri.

The Habitancum inscription contains also the expression Deo Mogonito Cad... with the letters following Cad missing. As the region is in the territory of the historic Scottish tribe called the Gadeni, centered around Jedburgh (Jed possibly from Cad), the Cad.. is interpreted as some case of Cadeni. One speculation is that the Cadeni were a section of the Vangiones. Some derive Cadeni from Gaedhal, or Gael. A third theory derives Cad from catu-, "battle", with a sense "to the battle god, Mogon...".

Considering that the gods worshipped in the future Alsace, then home of the Vangiones, were Celtic, such as Grannus, Moguns is currently taken to be Celtic. The -uns is a specifically Celtic suffix. As for the historic Gadeni, their origin is not known. They could be the remnants of the Vangiones or possibly among the indigenes. Perhaps the future discovery of additional inscriptions or the future publication of inscriptions already known but unpublished will shed further light on Mogons.

Locations of artifacts
Penrith Museum, Cumbria, England.
Carlisle Museum, Cumbria, England.

References

External links
Voreda
Castra Exploratorum
Habitancum
Bremenium
Vindolanda

Gaulish gods
Gods of the ancient Britons
War gods